The following is a list of media in Alexandria, Minnesota.

Print

Newspapers

Directories

Magazines

Television

Radio

FM

AM

External links
FCC TV Channel Guide
Northpine Alexandria Dial Guides

Radio stations in Alexandria, Minnesota
Mass media in Minnesota
Lists of mass media by city in the United States
Lists of media in Minnesota